Petarwar  (also spelled Petarbar, Peterbar, Peterwar) is a village in the Petarwar CD block in the Bermo subdivision of the Bokaro district in the Indian state of Jharkhand.

Geography

Location

Area overview
Bokaro district consists of undulating uplands on the Chota Nagpur Plateau with the Damodar River cutting a valley right across. The East Bokaro Coalfield located in the Bermo-Phusro area and small intrusions of Jharia Coalfield make Bokaro a coal rich district. In 1965, one of the largest steel manufacturing units in the country, Bokaro Steel Plant, operated by Steel Authority of India Limited, was set-up at Bokaro Steel City. The Damodar Valley Corporation established its first thermal power station at Bokaro (Thermal). The soil is generally infertile and agriculture is mostly rain-fed.

Note: The map alongside presents some of the notable locations in the district. All places marked in the map are linked in the larger full screen map.

Demographics
According to the 2011 Census of India, Petarbar had a total population of 5,060, of which 2,677 (53%) were males and 2,383 (47%) were females. Population in the age range 0–6 years was 615. The total number of literate persons in Petarbar was 3,351 (87.85% of the population over 6 years).

Civic administration

Police station
Petarwar police station is located at Thana Road Petarwar. It is around 250 metres from Tenu Chowk.

CD block HQ
The headquarters of Petarwar CD block are located at Petarwar.

Postal service
Petarwar comes under Giridih Postal Division (Jharkhand Circle) and has the pincode 829121.

Transport
NH 320 passes through Petarwar. It is very well connected in terms of road. Tenu chowk connects the NH 320 to Tenughat Dam and Gomia. The nearest railway station is Gomia Railway station at 27 km, along with Bokaro steel city at around 30 km.

References

Villages in Bokaro district